Tetrakis(triphenylphosphine)platinum(0) is the chemical compound with the formula Pt(P(C6H5)3)4, often abbreviated Pt(PPh3)4. The bright yellow compound is used as a precursor to other platinum complexes.

Structure and behavior
The molecule is tetrahedral, with point group symmetry of Td, as expected for a four-coordinate metal complex of a metal with the d10 configuration.  Even though this complex follows the 18 electron rule, it dissociates triphenylphosphine in solution to give the 16e− derivative containing only three PPh3 ligands:
Pt(PPh3)4  →  Pt(PPh3)3 + PPh3

Synthesis and reactions
The complex is typically prepared in one-pot reaction from potassium tetrachloroplatinate(II).  Reduction of this platinum(II) species with alkaline ethanol in the presence of excess triphenylphosphine affords the product as a precipitate.  The reaction occurs in two distinct steps.  In the first step, PtCl2(PPh3)2 is generated.  In the second step, this platinum(II) complex is reduced.  The overall synthesis can be summarized as:
K2[PtCl4] + 2KOH + 4PPh3 + C2H5OH →  Pt(PPh3)4 + 4KCl + CH3CHO + 2H2O

Pt(PPh3)4 reacts with oxidants to give platinum(II) derivatives:
Pt(PPh3)4  +  Cl2  →  cis-PtCl2(PPh3)2  +  2 PPh3
Mineral acids give the corresponding hydride complexes:
Pt(PPh3)4  +  HCl  →  trans-PtCl(H)(PPh3)2  +  2 PPh3

The reaction with oxygen affords a dioxygen complex:
Pt(PPh3)4  +  O2  →  Pt(η2-O2)(PPh3)2  +  2 PPh3
This complex is a precursor to the ethylene complex
Pt(η2-O2)(PPh3)2  +  C2H4  →  Pt(η2-C2H4)(PPh3)2   +  "NaBH2(OH)2"

References

Platinum compounds
Catalysts
Homogeneous catalysis
Triphenylphosphine complexes
Coordination complexes